This page details the career achievements of American basketball player Kevin Garnett.

Achievements
NBA Champion: 2008
Olympic gold medal: 2000
NBA Most Valuable Player: 2004
NBA Defensive Player of the Year: 2008
NBA All-Star Game MVP: 2003
15-time NBA All-Star: 1997—2011, 2013
Selected to 14 consecutive All-Star teams (1997—2011) (no game in 1999 due to lockout).
Selected, but did not play due to injury in 2008.
9-time All-NBA selection:
First Team: 2000, 2003, 2004, 2008
Second Team: 2001, 2002, 2005
Third Team: 1999, 2007
12-time All-Defensive:
First Team: 2000—2005, 2008—2009, 2011
Second Team: 2006—2007, 2012
NBA All-Rookie selection: 
Second Team: 1996
J. Walter Kennedy Citizenship Award: 2006
Career double-doubles (regular season): 717
Career triple-doubles (regular season): 16
Career triple-doubles (post-season): 3
Ranked #30 in SLAM Magazines 2009 revision of the top 50 greatest players of all time (published in the August 2009 issue)

NBA career statistics

Regular season

|-
| style="text-align:left;"| 
| style="text-align:left;"| Minnesota
| 80 || 43 || 28.7 || .491 || .286 || .705 || 6.3 || 1.8 || 1.1 || 1.6 || 10.4
|-
| style="text-align:left;"| 
| style="text-align:left;"| Minnesota
| 77 || 77 || 38.9 || .499 || .286 || .754 || 8.0 || 3.1 || 1.4 || 2.1 || 17.0
|-
| style="text-align:left;"| 
| style="text-align:left;"| Minnesota
| style="background:#cfecec;"| 82 || style="background:#cfecec;"| 82 || 39.3 || .491 || .188 || .738 || 9.6 || 4.2 || 1.7 || 1.8 || 18.5
|-
| style="text-align:left;"| 
| style="text-align:left;"| Minnesota
| 47 || 47 || 37.9 || .460 || .286 || .704 || 10.4 || 4.3 || 1.7 || 1.8 || 20.8
|-
| style="text-align:left;"| 
| style="text-align:left;"| Minnesota
| 81 || 81 || 40.0 || .497 || .370 || .765 || 11.8 || 5.0 || 1.5 || 1.6 || 22.9
|-
| style="text-align:left;"| 
| style="text-align:left;"| Minnesota
| 81 || 81 || 39.5 || .477 || .288 || .764 || 11.4 || 5.0 || 1.4 || 1.8 || 22.0
|-
| style="text-align:left;"| 
| style="text-align:left;"| Minnesota
| 81 || 81 || 39.2 || .470 || .319 || .801 || 12.1 || 5.2 || 1.2 || 1.6 || 21.2
|-
| style="text-align:left;"| 
| style="text-align:left;"| Minnesota
| style="background:#cfecec;"| 82 || style="background:#cfecec;"| 82 || 40.5 || .502 || .282 || .751 || 13.4 || 6.0 || 1.4 || 1.6 || 23.0
|-
| style="text-align:left;"| 
| style="text-align:left;"| Minnesota
| style="background:#cfecec;"| 82 || style="background:#cfecec;"| 82 || 39.4 || .499 || .256 || .791 || style="background:#cfecec;"| 13.9 || 5.0 || 1.5 || 2.2 || 24.2|-
| style="text-align:left;"| 
| style="text-align:left;"| Minnesota
| style="background:#cfecec;"| 82 || style="background:#cfecec;"| 82 || 38.1 || .502 || .240 || .811 || style="background:#cfecec;"| 13.5 || 5.7 || 1.5 || 1.4 || 22.2
|-
| style="text-align:left;"| 
| style="text-align:left;"| Minnesota
| 76 || 76 || 38.9 || .526 || .267 || .810 || style="background:#cfecec;"| 12.7 || 4.1 || 1.4 || 1.4 || 21.8
|-
| style="text-align:left;"| 
| style="text-align:left;"| Minnesota
| 76 || 76 || 39.4 || .476 || .214 || .835 || style="background:#cfecec;"| 12.8 || 4.1 || 1.2 || 1.7 || 22.4
|-
|  style="text-align:left; background:#afe6ba;"| †
| style="text-align:left;"| Boston
| 71 || 71 || 32.8 || .539 || .000 || .801 || 9.2 || 3.4 || 1.4 || 1.2 || 18.8
|-
| style="text-align:left;"| 
| style="text-align:left;"| Boston
| 57 || 57 || 31.1 || .531 || .250 || .841 || 8.5 || 2.5 || 1.1 || 1.2 || 15.8
|-
| style="text-align:left;"| 
| style="text-align:left;"| Boston
| 69 || 69 || 29.9 || .521 || .200 || .837 || 7.3 || 2.7 || 1.0 || .8 || 14.3
|-
| style="text-align:left;"| 
| style="text-align:left;"| Boston
| 71 || 71 || 31.3 || .528 || .200 || .862 || 8.9 || 2.4 || 1.3 || .8 || 14.9
|-
| style="text-align:left;"| 
| style="text-align:left;"| Boston
| 60 || 60 || 31.1 || .503 || .333 || .857 || 8.2 || 2.9 || .9 || 1.0 || 15.8
|-
| style="text-align:left;"| 
| style="text-align:left;"| Boston
| 68 || 68 || 29.7 || .496 || .125 || .786 || 7.8 || 2.3 || 1.1 || .9 || 14.8
|-
| style="text-align:left;"| 
| style="text-align:left;"| Brooklyn
| 54 || 54 || 20.5 || .441 || .000 || .809 || 6.6 || 1.5 || .8 || .7 || 6.5
|-
| style="text-align:left;"| 
| style="text-align:left;"| Brooklyn
| 42 || 42 || 20.3 || .455 || .167 || .829 || 6.8 || 1.6 || 1.0 || .3 || 6.8
|-
| style="text-align:left;"| 
| style="text-align:left;"| Minnesota
| 5 || 5 || 19.6 || .581 || .000 || .500 || 5.2 || 1.6 || 1.0 || .8 || 7.6
|-
| style="text-align:left;"| 
| style="text-align:left;"| Minnesota
| 38 || 38 || 14.6 || .470 || .000 || .667 || 3.9 || 1.6 || .7 || .3 || 3.2
|-class="unsortable"
| style="text-align:left;"| Career
| style="text-align:left;"|
| 1,462 || 1,425 || 34.5 || .497 || .275 || .789 || 10.0 || 3.7 || 1.3 || 1.4 || 17.8
|-class="unsortable"
| style="text-align:left;"| All-Star
| style="text-align:left;"|
| 14 || 11 || 20.5 || .511 || .000 || .875 || 6.3 || 2.9 || 1.1 || .8 || 11.3

Playoffs

|-
| style="text-align:left;"| 1997
| style="text-align:left;"| Minnesota
| 3 || 3 || 41.7 || .471 || 1.000 || 1.000 || 9.3 || 3.7 || 1.3 || 1.0 || 17.3
|-
| style="text-align:left;"| 1998
| style="text-align:left;"| Minnesota
| 5 || 5 || 38.8 || .480 || .000 || .778 || 9.6 || 4.0 || .8 || 2.4 || 15.8
|-
| style="text-align:left;"| 1999
| style="text-align:left;"| Minnesota
| 4 || 4 || 42.5 || .443 || .000 || .739 || 12.0 || 3.8 || 1.8 || 2.0 || 21.8
|-
| style="text-align:left;"| 2000
| style="text-align:left;"| Minnesota
| 4 || 4 || 42.8 || .385 || .667 || .813 || 10.8 || 8.8 || 1.3 || .8 || 18.8
|-
| style="text-align:left;"| 2001
| style="text-align:left;"| Minnesota
| 4 || 4 || 41.3 || .466 || .000 || .833 || 12.0 || 4.3 || 1.0 || 1.5 || 21.0
|-
| style="text-align:left;"| 2002
| style="text-align:left;"| Minnesota
| 3 || 3 || 43.3 || .429 || .500 || .719 || style="background:#cfecec;"| 18.7 || 5.0 || 1.7 || 1.7 || 24.0
|-
| style="text-align:left;"| 2003
| style="text-align:left;"| Minnesota
| 6 || 6 || 44.2 || .514 || .333 || .607 || 15.7 || 5.2 || 1.7 || 1.7 || 27.0|-
| style="text-align:left;"| 2004
| style="text-align:left;"| Minnesota
| 18 || 18 || 43.5 || .452 || .313 || .776 || style="background:#cfecec;"| 14.6 || 5.1 || 1.3 || 2.3 || 24.3
|-
|  style="text-align:left; background:#afe6ba;"| 2008†
| style="text-align:left;"| Boston
| style="background:#cfecec;"| 26 || style="background:#cfecec;"| 26 || 38.0 || .495 || .250 || .810 || 10.5 || 3.3 || 1.3 || 1.1 || 20.4
|-
| style="text-align:left;"| 2010
| style="text-align:left;"| Boston
| 23 || 23 || 33.3 || .495 || .000 || .839 || 7.4 || 2.5 || 1.1 || .9 || 15.0
|-
| style="text-align:left;"| 2011
| style="text-align:left;"| Boston
| 9 || 9 || 36.3 || .441 || .000 || .759 || 10.9 || 2.6 || 1.9 || 1.0 || 14.9
|-
| style="text-align:left;"| 2012
| style="text-align:left;"| Boston
| 20 || 20 || 36.9 || .497 || .250 || .813 || 10.3 || 1.5 || 1.2 || 1.5 || 19.2
|-
| style="text-align:left;"| 2013
| style="text-align:left;"| Boston
| 6 || 6 || 35.3 || .500 || .000 || .941 || 13.7 || 3.5 || .8 || 1.0 || 12.7
|-
| style="text-align:left;"| 2014
| style="text-align:left;"| Brooklyn
| 12 || 12 || 20.8 || .524 || .000 || .739 || 6.3 || 1.3 || .8 || .4 || 6.9
|- class="unsortable"
| style="text-align:left;" colspan=2| Career
| 143 || 143 || 36.9 || .478 || .273 || .789 || 10.7 || 3.3 || 1.2 || 1.3 || 18.2

NBA regular season leader
 Points: 2004 (1,987)
 Field goals made: 2004 (804)
 Field goal attempts: 2004 (1,611)
 Rebounds per game: 2004 (13.9), 2005 (13.5), 2006 (12.7), 2007 (12.8)
 Total rebounds: 2004 (1,139), 2005 (1,108)
 Defensive rebounds: 2003 (858), 2004 (894), 2005 (861), 2006 (752), 2007 (792)
 Games played: 1998 (82)
Garnett has played in all 82 of his team's games in four seasons.Double-doubles: 2003 (68), 2004 (71), 2005 (69), 2006 (62), 2007 (66)

NBA records

Regular seasonOnly player in NBA history to reach at least 25,000 points, 10,000 rebounds, 5,000 assists, 1,500 steals and 1,500 blocks in his careerOnly player in NBA history to average at least 20 points, 10 rebounds and 5 assists per game for 6 consecutive seasons (—)Only player in NBA history to average at least 20 points, 10 rebounds and 4 assists per game for 9 consecutive seasons (—)Most All-Defensive First Team honors won: 9 (tied with Michael Jordan, Gary Payton, and Kobe Bryant)Seasons leading the league in defensive rebounds: 5 (—)
Broken by Dwight Howard (—)Consecutive seasons leading the league in defensive rebounds: 5 (—)
Broken by Dwight Howard (—)Third player in NBA history to lead his team in all five major statistics (points, rebounds, assists, steals, blocks) in the same season: Minnesota Timberwolves, 
Also achieved by Michael Jordan, Hakeem Olajuwon, David Robinson, and Giannis AntetokounmpoFirst player in NBA History to win Conference Player of the Month Award four times in a single season
 Also achieved by LeBron James, who has achieved this twice

PlayoffsDefensive rebounds, 5-game series: 66, for Minnesota Timberwolves vs. Denver Nuggets (2004)
Broken by Tim Duncan in 2008Defensive rebounds, game: 20, twice 
20, for Minnesota Timberwolves vs. Denver Nuggets,  
20, for Minnesota Timberwolves vs. Sacramento Kings,  
Tied with Dave Cowens, Bill Walton and Tim Duncan

All-StarPoints, overtime: 9, second overtime (2003)

Ranks 1st in NBA history

Regular seasonDefensive rebounds, career: 11,453

PlayoffsDefensive rebounds, 5-game series: 66, for Minnesota Timberwolves vs. Denver Nuggets, (2004)Defensive rebounds, 6-game series: 83, for Minnesota Timberwolves vs. Los Angeles Lakers (2003)Defensive rebounds, game: 19, for Minnesota Timberwolves vs. Los Angeles Lakers, Turnovers, game: 10, for Minnesota Timberwolves at Seattle SuperSonics, 

All-StarGames: 14 (1997—2007, 2009—2011, 2013)
15 selections (he was also selected in 2008, but did not play due to injury)
Trailing Kareem Abdul-Jabbar (18)Minutes played: 41 (2003) (2 OT)Field goals made, game: 17 (2003) (2 OT)
 Tied with Wilt Chamberlain (1962) and Michael Jordan (1988)
 Broken by Blake Griffin (19) (2014)

Ranks 3rd in NBA history

Regular seasonConsecutive seasons leading the league in rebounding''': 4 (—)
Trailing Dennis Rodman (7) and Moses Malone (5)

Minnesota Timberwolves franchise records

Regular season

Service
Games played, career: 927

Games played, season: 82, four times

Consecutive games played: 351,  to 

Games started, career: 890

Games started, season: 82, four times

Consecutive games started: 351,  to 

Minutes played, career: 35,535

Minutes played, season: 3,321

Scoring
Points, career: 19,041

Points, season: 1,987

Highest scoring average, points per game, season: 24.2 (1,987/82)
Broken by Kevin Love in  (26.0; 1,432/55)

Points, game: 47, vs. Phoenix Suns, 

Games scoring 20 or more points, season: 67

Games scoring 10 or more points, season: 82, four times

Consecutive games scoring 30 or more points: 4,  to 

Consecutive games scoring 20 or more points: 16, twice
16,  to 
16,  to 

Consecutive games scoring 10 or more points: 398,  to 

Most games led or shared team's scoring lead: 60

Field goals
Highest field goal percentage, season: .526 (626—1,191)

Highest field goal percentage, game: .923 (12—13), at Portland Trail Blazers, 

Highest field goal percentage, half: 1.000 (9—9), first half, vs. Dallas Mavericks, 

Consecutive field goals made: 13, twice
13,  to 
13,  to 

Field goals made, career: 7,575

Field goals made, season: 804

Field goals made, game: 19, vs. Phoenix Suns, 
Tied with Wally Szczerbiak (vs. Chicago Bulls)

Field goals made, half: 13, first half, vs. Sacramento Kings, 

Field goal attempts, career: 15,414

Field goal attempts, season: 1,611

Field goal attempts, game: 33, vs. New Jersey Nets, 

Field goal attempts, half: 20, second half, vs. New Jersey Nets, 

Free throws
Free throw made, career: 3,727

Free throw attempts, career: 4,781

Rebounding
Rebounds, career: 14662

Highest average, rebounds per game, career: 11.4 (10,542/927)

Rebounds, season: 1,139

Highest average, rebounds per game, season: 13.9 (1,139/82)
Broken by Kevin Love in  (15.2)

Rebounds, game: 25, twice
25, at Sacramento Kings,  (OT)
25, vs. Orlando Magic, 
Broken by Kevin Love (vs. New York Knicks)

Rebounds, half: 19, first half, at Orlando Magic, 
Broken by Kevin Love (second half, vs. New York Knicks)

Rebounds, quarter: 12
Broken by Kevin Love (third quarter, vs. New York Knicks)

Offensive rebounds, career: 2,571

Defensive rebounds, career: 7,971

Defensive rebounds, season: 894

Defensive rebounds, game: 23, twice
23, at Sacramento Kings,  (OT)
23, vs. Orlando Magic, 

Assists
Assists, career: 4,146

Assists, overtime: 4, vs. Atlanta Hawks, 
Tied with Malik Sealy (vs. Toronto Raptors)

Steals
Steals, career: 1,282

Blocked shots
Blocked shots, career: 1,576

Blocked shots, season: 178

Blocked shots, overtime: 3, at New Jersey Nets, 

Personal fouls
Personal fouls, career: 2,355

Turnovers
Turnovers, career: 2,387

Triple-doubles
Triple-doubles, career: 19 (16 regular season, 3 playoffs)

Triple-doubles, season: 6

Double-doubles
Double-doubles, career: 607

Double-doubles, season: 71

Consecutive games with a double-double: 37,  to 

Blocked shots, season: 131

Blocked shots, game: 7, vs. Dallas Mavericks,

Playoffs

Service
Minutes played, career: 2,003

Minutes played, 7-game series: 311, vs. Sacramento Kings, 2004 (44.4 mpg)

Minutes played, 6-game series: 265, twice
265, vs. Los Angeles Lakers, 2003 (44.2 mpg)
265, vs. Los Angeles Lakers, 2004 (44.2 mpg)

Minutes played, 4-game series: 171, vs. Portland Trail Blazers, 2000 (42.8 mpg)

Scoring
Points, career: 1,049

Points, 7-game series: 167, vs. Sacramento Kings, 2004 (23.9 ppg)

Points, 6-game series: 162, vs. Los Angeles Lakers, 2003 (27.0 ppg)

Points, 5-game series: 129, vs. Denver Nuggets, 2004 (25.8 ppg)

Points, 4-game series: 87, vs. San Antonio Spurs, 1999 (21.8 ppg)

Points, 3-game series: 72, vs. Dallas Mavericks, 2002 (24.0 ppg)

Points, overtime: 6, at Sacramento Kings,

Field goals
Field goal percentage, 6-game series: .514 (71—138), vs. Los Angeles Lakers, 2003

Field goal percentage, 5-game series: .480 (36—75), vs. Seattle SuperSonics, 1998

Field goal percentage, game: .714 (15—21), vs. Los Angeles Lakers, 

Field goals made, career: 415

Field goals made, 7-game series: 62, vs. Sacramento Kings, 2004

Field goals made, 6-game series: 71, vs. Los Angeles Lakers, 2003

Field goals made, 5-game series: 49, vs. Denver Nuggets, 2004

Field goals made, 4-game series: 35, vs. San Antonio Spurs, 1999

Field goal attempts, career: 907

Field goal attempts, 7-game series: 141, vs. Sacramento Kings, 2004

Field goal attempts, 6-game series: 138, vs. Los Angeles Lakers, 2003

Field goal attempts, 5-game series: 108, vs. Denver Nuggets, 2004

Field goal attempts, 4-game series: 79, vs. San Antonio Spurs, 1999

Field goal attempts, game: 31, at Los Angeles Lakers,  (OT)

Field goal attempts, game (regulation): 30, vs. Denver Nuggets,

Free throws
Free throw percentage, 7-game series: .820 (41—50), vs. Sacramento Kings, 2004

Free throws made, career: 207

Free throws made, 7-game series: 41, vs. Sacramento Kings, 2004

Free throws made, 5-game series: 31, vs. Denver Nuggets, 2004

Free throws made, 4-game series: 30, vs. San Antonio Spurs, 2001

Free throws made, 3-game series: 23, vs. Dallas Mavericks, 2002

Free throw attempts, career: 272

Free throw attempts, 7-game series: 50, vs. Sacramento Kings, 2004

Free throw attempts, 5-game series: 43, vs. Denver Nuggets, 2004

Free throw attempts, 4-game series: 36, vs. San Antonio Spurs, 2001

Free throw attempts, 3-game series: 32, vs. Dallas Mavericks, 2002

Free throw attempts, game: 17, at Dallas Mavericks,

Rebounding
Rebounds, career: 628

Rebounds, 7-game series: 108, vs. Sacramento Kings, 2004 (15.4 rpg)

Rebounds, 6-game series: 94, vs. Los Angeles Lakers, 2003 (15.7 rpg)

Rebounds, 5-game series: 74, vs. Denver Nuggets, 2004 (14.8 rpg)

Rebounds, 4-game series: 48, twice
48, vs. San Antonio Spurs, 1999 (12.0 rpg)
48, vs. San Antonio Spurs, 2001 (12.0 rpg)

Rebounds, 3-game series: 56, vs. Dallas Mavericks, 2002 (18.7 rpg)

Rebounds, game: 22, vs. Denver Nuggets, 

Offensive rebounds, career: 136

Offensive rebounds, 7-game series: 18, vs. Sacramento Kings, 2004

Offensive rebounds, 6-game series: 13, vs. Los Angeles Lakers, 2004

Offensive rebounds, 5-game series: 17, vs. Seattle SuperSonics, 1998

Offensive rebounds, 4-game series: 16, vs. San Antonio Spurs, 1999

Defensive rebounds, career: 492

Defensive rebounds, 7-game series: 90, vs. Sacramento Kings, 2004

Defensive rebounds, 6-game series: 83, vs. Los Angeles Lakers, 2003

Defensive rebounds, 5-game series: 66, vs. Denver Nuggets, 2004

Defensive rebounds, 4-game series: 38, vs. San Antonio Spurs, 2001

Defensive rebounds, 3-game series: 40, vs. Dallas Mavericks, 2002

Defensive rebounds, game: 20, twice
20, vs. Denver Nuggets, 
20, vs. Sacramento Kings,

Assists
Assists, career: 236

Assists, 4-game series: 35, vs. Portland Trail Blazers, 2000 (8.8 apg)

Steals
Steals, career: 63

Steals, 7-game series: 12, vs. Sacramento Kings, 2004 (1.7 spg)

Steals, 6-game series: 10, vs. Los Angeles Lakers, 2003 (1.7 spg)

Blocked shots
Blocked shots, career: 88

Blocked shots, 7-game series: 24, vs. Sacramento Kings, 2004 (3.4 bpg)

Blocked shots, 6-game series: 10, vs. Los Angeles Lakers, 2003 (1.7 bpg)

Blocked shots, 5-game series: 12, vs. Seattle SuperSonics, 1998 (2.4 bpg)

Blocked shots, 4-game series: 8, vs. San Antonio Spurs, 1999 (2.0 bpg)
Tied with Joe Smith in the same series.

Blocked shots, 3-game series: 5, vs. Dallas Mavericks, 2002 (1.7 bpg)

Blocked shots, game: 6, vs. Sacramento Kings,

Personal fouls
Personal fouls, career: 149

Turnovers
Turnovers, career: 161

Turnovers, game: 10, at Seattle SuperSonics,

See also
List of National Basketball Association career scoring leaders
List of National Basketball Association franchise career scoring leaders
List of National Basketball Association career free throw scoring leaders
List of National Basketball Association career rebounding leaders
List of National Basketball Association career steals leaders
List of National Basketball Association career blocks leaders
List of National Basketball Association career turnovers leaders
List of National Basketball Association annual rebounding leaders

References

Garnett, Kevin